John Wentworth Pardoe (born 27 July 1934) is a retired British businessman and Liberal Party politician. He was Chairman of Sight and Sound Education Ltd from 1979 to 1989.

Early life and education
Pardoe was the son of Cuthbert B. Pardoe and Marjorie E. W. (née Taylor). He attended King's College School, Cambridge, and was a chorister in the Choir of King's College, Cambridge. He then went to Sherborne School, a boarding independent school for boys in the market town of Sherborne in Dorset, followed by Corpus Christi College, Cambridge. He was active in the famous Footlights drama club; one critic of their 1955 revue panned future comedian Jonathan Miller, whilst predicting a bold comedic future for Pardoe. He gained an MA at Cambridge.

Early career 
Pardoe worked for Television Audience Measurement Ltd from 1958 to 1960, Osborne Peacock Co. Ltd from 1960 to 1961 and Liberal News from 1961 to 1966.

Political career
In the 1964 general election, Pardoe unsuccessfully stood as the Liberal candidate against Margaret Thatcher in Finchley. In the 1966 election, the Liberal Party increased its number of MPs from nine to twelve: one of them was Pardoe, who captured the North Cornwall seat from the Conservative Party's James Scott-Hopkins. He rapidly became the party's Economic Affairs spokesman in parliament and was respected for the intellect of his views, if not for the often partisan nature of his comments. Pardoe was Treasurer of the Liberal Party from 1968 to 1969.

In the 1960s, Pardoe was a member of Mebyon Kernow as well as the Liberal Party.

In 1976, after the resignation of Jeremy Thorpe, Pardoe was a candidate for the leadership of the Liberal Party. He lost to David Steel, who received 12,541 votes to Pardoe's 7,032.

Pardoe played the fairy-tale Liberal prime minister in BBC Radio 4's Christmas pantomime, Black Cinderella Two Goes East in 1978, on the basis that Liberal prime ministers exist only in fairy tales.

At the 1979 general election, he lost his seat, possibly because of his outspoken support for neighbouring MP Jeremy Thorpe, who was then about to stand trial at the Old Bailey for conspiracy and incitement to murder.

At the general election of 1987, Pardoe served as campaign manager of the SDP-Liberal Alliance.

Outside politics 
From 1967 to 1973, Pardoe was a consultant to the National Association of Schoolmasters. He was a director at William Schlackman Ltd from 1968 to 1971, Gerald Metals (1972–83) and a Member of the London Metal Exchange from 1973 to 1983.

Pardoe was a presenter of LWT's Look Here television programme from 1979 to 1981. In the same period, he was also a Senior Research Fellow at the Policy Studies Institute. From 1985 to 1989, he was a member of the Youth Training Board.

Personal life 
In 1958, Pardoe married Joyce R. Peerman; the couple have two sons and a daughter. Pardoe lives in Hampstead, north west London.

His recreations are walking, reading, music and carpentry.

References

External links 

 

1934 births
Living people
Liberal Party (UK) MPs for English constituencies
Politicians from Cornwall
Presidents of the Liberal Party (UK)
UK MPs 1966–1970
UK MPs 1970–1974
UK MPs 1974
UK MPs 1974–1979
Members of the Parliament of the United Kingdom for North Cornwall
Choristers of the Choir of King's College, Cambridge
People educated at Sherborne School
Alumni of Corpus Christi College, Cambridge